The 1816–17 United States Senate elections were held on various dates in various states. As these U.S. Senate elections were prior to the ratification of the Seventeenth Amendment in 1913, senators were chosen by state legislatures. Senators were elected over a wide range of time throughout 1816 and 1817, and a seat may have been filled months late or remained vacant due to legislative deadlock. In these elections, terms were up for the senators in Class 2.

The Democratic-Republican Party gained a net of two seats from the admission of a new state.

Results summary 
Senate party division, 15th Congress (1817–1819)

 Majority party: Democratic-Republican (25–28)
 Minority party: Federalist (13–12)
 Total seats: 38–42

Change in composition

Results of the January 1816 special elections

Before the general elections

Results of the general elections

Results of the 1817 special elections

Race summaries

Elections during the preceding Congress 
In these special and general elections, the winners were seated during 1816 or before March 4, 1817; ordered by election date.

Races leading to the next Congress 
In these general elections, the winners were seated March 4, 1817; ordered by state.

All of the elections involved the Class 2 seats.

Elections during the next Congress 
In three special elections and two general elections, the winners were elected in 1817 after March 4; ordered by election date.

Delaware

Georgia

Georgia (regular)

Georgia (special)

Indiana 

The new state of Indiana elected its first two senators, both Democratic-Republicans, James Noble and Waller Taylor.  The election was held November 8, 1816 in advance of Indiana's December 11, 1816 admission as a state.  In the election legislators cast a single ballot and the first and second place candidates were deemed elected.

Kentucky

Kentucky (regular)

Kentucky (special)

Louisiana

Maryland (special)

Maryland (special, January 1816) 

Robert Goodloe Harper won election over John Thomson Mason by a margin of 1.12%, or 1 votes, for the Class 1 seat.

Maryland (special, December 1816) 

Robert Goodloe Harper won election over John Thomson Mason by a margin of 1.12%, or 1 votes, for the Class 1 seat.

Massachusetts

Massachusetts (regular)

Massachusetts (special)

Mississippi 

The new state of Mississippi elected its first two senators, both Democratic-Republicans, Walter Leake and Thomas H. Williams.  Two separate elections were held in which each senator was elected.

First Senator (Class 1)(5th ballot, date and previous ballots unknown)

Second Senator (Class 2)(4th ballot, date and previous ballots unknown)

New Hampshire

New Hampshire (regular)

New Hampshire (special)

New Jersey

North Carolina

North Carolina (regular)

North Carolina (special)

Rhode Island

South Carolina

South Carolina (regular)

South Carolina (special)

Tennessee

Tennessee (regular)

Tennessee (special)

Vermont (special)

Virginia

Virginia (regular)

Virginia (special)

See also 
 1816 United States elections
 1816 United States presidential election
 1816–17 United States House of Representatives elections
 14th United States Congress
 15th United States Congress

Notes

References 

 Party Division in the Senate, 1789-Present, via Senate.gov